Lithuania competed at the 2014 Winter Olympics in Sochi, Russia from 7 to 23 February 2014. The team consists of nine athletes competing in five different sports. The nine athletes mark the most athletes the country has ever qualified for a Winter Olympics.

On 19 December 2013 in Brussels, Belgium Lithuanian president Dalia Grybauskaitė stated that she won't go to the Games due to Russia’s politics and said "Amid the current situation where I see human rights violations, as well as an attitude towards and treatment of Eastern Partners, including Lithuania, and the economic sanctions that have been applied against Lithuania, I do not see a political possibility of going to the Sochi Games".

Alpine skiing 

According to the final quota allocation released on January 20, 2014, Lithuania has two athletes in qualification positions.

Biathlon

Based on their performance at the 2012 and 2013 Biathlon World Championships Lithuania qualified 1 man and 1 woman.

Cross-country skiing 

According to the final quota allocation released on January 20, 2014, Lithuania has two athletes in qualification position.

Distance

Sprint

Figure skating 

The Lithuanian president Dalia Grybauskaitė had initially refused to give citizenship to ice dancer Deividas Stagniūnas' partner Isabella Tobias. This would be second time that Stagniūnas would be unable to participate in the Olympics because of his partner's citizenship requests, hadn't president decided to give citizenship to Tobias on 2 December 2013. In 2013 World championships Tobias and Stagniūnas qualified for the Olympics.

Short track speed skating 

Lithuania qualified 1 female athlete for the Olympics during World Cup 3 & 4 in November 2013. This will mark Lithuania's debut in the sport.

Women

Qualification legend: Q – Qualified for next round ADV – Advanced due to being impeded by another skater; FA – Qualify to medal round; FB – Qualify to consolation round

See also
Lithuania at the 2014 Summer Youth Olympics

References

External links 

Lithuania at the 2014 Olympics

2014 in Lithuanian sport
Nations at the 2014 Winter Olympics
2010